U.S. Route 84 (US 84) in Alabama travels west to east across southern Alabama for . US 84 enters the state from Mississippi west of Silas and exits into Georgia southeast of Gordon. Along its route, US 84 passes through the limits of the towns and cities of Silas, Coffeeville, Grove Hill, Repton, Evergreen, River Falls, Andalusia, Sanford, Babbie, Opp, Elba, New Brockton, Enterprise, Level Plains, Daleville, Dothan, Cowarts, Avon, Ashford.

Between Mississippi and River Falls, with the exception of a small segment near Grove Hill, US 84 is largely a rural two-lane road. Between River Falls and Georgia, the route is a major four-lane divided highway connecting major towns of southeastern Alabama. For most of its route through Alabama, excluding a section in Dothan where it is alternatively known as East and West Main Street, US 84 is internally designated by the state of Alabama as State Route 12 (SR 12).

History
When U.S. Route 84 was initially designated in 1926, its western terminus was located in Dothan. In 1934, the route was extended west, overlapping US 43 southward from Grove Hill to end at Chatom, quite a distance south of its present route. By around 1950, this gap had been removed. While US 84's western terminus was extended further westward into Mississippi in 1935 and eventually Texas by the next year, there remained a gap in US 84 between Chatom and Waynesboro, Mississippi. By 1950, this gap had been removed and the highway become continuous. It is unknown when US 84 was moved to its current route through Coffeeville.

Major intersections

References

 Alabama
Transportation in Choctaw County, Alabama
Transportation in Clarke County, Alabama
Transportation in Monroe County, Alabama
Transportation in Conecuh County, Alabama
Transportation in Covington County, Alabama
Transportation in Coffee County, Alabama
Transportation in Dale County, Alabama
Transportation in Houston County, Alabama
84